is a city located in the northwestern corner of Chiba Prefecture, Japan. , the city had an estimated population of 154,114 in 69,191 households and a population density of 1500 persons per km2. The city is famous for its production of soy sauce.

Geography
Noda is the northernmost city in Chiba Prefecture, and the 36th parallel north passes through it. It is about 40 kilometers from then prefectural capital at Chiba, and 30 to 40 kilometers from central Tokyo. The city center is surrounded by rivers on three sides, with the Shimōsa Plateau, the Tone River to the east of the city, the Edo River to the west, and the Tone Canal to the south. Ibaraki Prefecture is on the opposite bank across the Tone River, and Saitama Prefecture is on the opposite bank across the Edo River.

Neighboring municipalities
Chiba Prefecture
Kashiwa
Nagareyama
Saitama Prefecture
Kasukabe
Yoshikawa
Satte
Matsubushi
Sugito
Ibaraki Prefecture
Bandō
Moriya
Jōsō
Goka
Sakai

Climate
Noda has a humid subtropical climate (Köppen Cfa) characterized by warm summers and cool winters with light to no snowfall.  The average annual temperature in Noda is 14.6 °C. The average annual rainfall is 1351 mm with September as the wettest month. The temperatures are highest on average in August, at around 26.6 °C, and lowest in January, at around 3.7 °C.

Demographics
Per Japanese census data, the population of Noda has recently plateaued after a long period of growth.

History
The area around Noda has been inhabited since prehistory, and archaeologists have found ancient shell middens in the area. During the late Heian period, the area was controlled by Kamakura Gongorō Kagemasa, and a succession of minor warlords during the Sengoku period. During the Edo period, Noda developed as a river port, post town on the pilgrimage road to Nikko, and a center for the production of soy sauce. Neighboring Sekiyado was controlled by the Later Hōjō clan during the Sengoku period, and developed as a castle town under Sekiyado Domain, a feudal han under the Tokugawa shogunate.

After the Meiji Restoration, Noda and Sekiyado towns were created on April 1, 1889 with the establishment of the modern municipalities system. Noda was elevated to city status on May 3, 1950.

On June 6, 2003, the town of Sekiyado (from Higashikatsushika District) was merged into Noda.

Government
Noda has a mayor-council form of government with a directly elected mayor and a unicameral city council of 28 members. Noda contributes two members to the Chiba Prefectural Assembly. In terms of national politics, the city is part of Chiba 7th district of the lower house of the Diet of Japan.

Economy
Noda is a regional commercial center and, due to its proximity, a bedroom community for nearby Chiba and Tokyo, with 13% of the population commuting daily to Tokyo per the 2010 census. Noda has a mixed economy, with Kikkoman soy sauce being the most prominent employer. The city has several industrial parks. There is some residual agriculture, primarily of edamame, for which Noda was historically famous.

Education
 Tokyo University of Science – Noda Campus
 Chiba University of Commerce
 Noda has 20 public elementary schools and 11 public middle schools operated by the city government, and three public high schools operated by the Chiba Prefectural Board of Education. The prefecture also operates one special education school for the handicapped. There are also one private middle school and two private high schools.

Transportation

Railway
  Tōbu Railway  -  Tōbu Noda Line
  -  -  -  -  -

Highways

Local attractions
 Sekiyado Castle
Kantarō Suzuki Memorial Museum

Sister city relations
  Whakatane, Bay of Plenty Region,  New Zealand, since November 16, 1997.

Notable people from Noda
 Kyōko Aizome, AV actress and movie director
 Katsumasa Uchida, actor
Masaaki Hatsumi, martial arts instructor
Dabo, Japanese rap musician
Mai Oshima, idol singer
Takahiro Oshima, professional soccer player
Kiyoshi Kimura, Tuna King and head of Kiyomura Corporation

References

External links

Official Website 

 
Cities in Chiba Prefecture